Daniel Berger may refer to:

Daniel Berger (engraver) (1744–1825), German engraver
Daniel Berger (golfer) (born 1993), American golfer
Daniel Berger (physician) (born 1957), American physician